Evan King (born March 25, 1992) is an American professional tennis player.

King has a career high ATP singles ranking of world No. 185, achieved in April 2018. He also has a career high ATP doubles ranking of No. 113, achieved in February 2020. He has won ten doubles titles on the ATP Challenger Tour. On the ITF Pro Circuit, King has six career singles titles and 22 career doubles titles.

King holds the record for most combined career men's singles and doubles wins at the University of Michigan.

King was a three-time ITA All-American (2011, '12, '13), a two-time Big Ten Athlete of the Year (2012, '13), and a four-time All-Big Ten (2010, '11, '12, '13) player.

Professional career
King made his ATP main-draw debut at the 2009 Delray Beach International Tennis Championships as a 17 year old.

At the 2021 US Open (tennis) he reached the third round of a Grand Slam for the first time in his career as a wildcard pair partnering fellow American Hunter Reese defeating ninth seeds Kubot/Melo in the first round and then Krajicek/Inglot in the second.

World TeamTennis

King has played two seasons with World TeamTennis starting in 2018 when he debuted in the league with the Orange County Breakers. In 2019 he joined the expansion Orlando Storm for their inaugural season. This year, it was announced that he will join his hometown expansion team the Chicago Smash during the 2020 season set to begin July 12.

King paired up with Rajeev Ram multiple times throughout the 2020 season in men's doubles. The Smash were seeded second in the WTT Playoffs and defeated the Orlando Storm for a spot in the final, where they ultimately fell to the New York Empire.

Challenger and Futures finals

Singles: 11 (6–5)

Doubles: 58 (34 titles, 24 runners-up)

References

External links
 
 

1992 births
Living people
American male tennis players
Tennis players from Chicago
Michigan Wolverines men's tennis players
21st-century American people